The Institute for Environmental and Technology Law (German: Institut für Umwelt- und Technikrecht (IUTR)), established in 1989, is a central academic institution of the University of Trier. The institute is specialized in research and teaching in the fields of environmental law and technology law.

University of Trier
Educational institutions established in 1989
1989 establishments in West Germany